Category 3 is the third-highest classification on the Saffir–Simpson hurricane wind scale, and categorizes tropical cyclones with 1-minute maximum sustained winds between . Tropical cyclones that attain such winds and move over land while maintaining those winds are capable of causing severe damage to human lives and infrastructure. From 1949 to 2022, a total of 84 recorded Pacific hurricanes have peaked at Category 3 strength within the Northeast Pacific tropical cyclone basin, which is denoted as the part of the Pacific Ocean north of the equator and east of the International Date Line. This does not include storms that also attained Category 4 or 5 status on the scale.

The development of Category 3 hurricanes in the Northeast Pacific basin is influenced by many factors. During the Northern Hemisphere winter and spring months of December to April, sea surface temperatures in the tropics are usually too low to support tropical cyclogenesis. Furthermore, from January to April, the North Pacific High and Aleutian Low induce strong vertical wind shear and unfavorable conditions that serve to prevent the development of hurricanes. These effects are reduced or even disappear during hurricane season from May to November, when sea surface temperatures are also high enough to support tropical cyclogenesis; the bulk of recorded Category 3 hurricanes developed during June to October. Global weather patterns may also influence hurricane development in the Northeast Pacific. El Niño events result in increased numbers of powerful hurricanes through weaker wind shear and higher sea surface temperatures within the basin, while La Niña events reduce the number of such hurricanes through the opposite.

Background

When a hurricane reaches Category 3 intensity, it is termed a "major hurricane" by the NHC, though this term is also used to describe hurricanes at Category 4 or 5 intensity. Should a Category 3 hurricane make landfall, its strongest winds can cause very severe damage to human infrastructure, with debris carried by the winds capable of bringing injury or death to humans and animals.

The Northeast Pacific tropical cyclone basin is defined as the region of the Pacific Ocean north of the equator and east of the International Date Line. The Northeast Pacific is further divided into two sub-basins, namely the east and central Pacific. The east Pacific runs east of the 140th meridian west, and tropical cyclones occurring there are warned upon by the National Hurricane Center, the current Regional Specialized Meteorological Center (RSMC) for that area. The central Pacific, running from the 140th meridian west to the International Date Line, currently has the Central Pacific Hurricane Center as its RSMC. Tropical cyclones are generally much rarer in the central Pacific than in the east Pacific, with an average of just four to five storms forming or moving into the central Pacific compared to around 15 for the east Pacific. All tropical cyclones recorded by past and present RSMCs of the Northeast Pacific basin since 1949 are listed in the Northeast and North Central Pacific hurricane database (HURDAT), which is compiled and maintained by the National Hurricane Center.

Exceptions to these rules would be storms that affected humans and as such humans were able to measure or estimate wind speeds or pressure data. Due to this lack of specific intensity records, there has been only one confirmed Category 3 hurricane prior to 1970.

Climatology

Hurricane season in the Northeast Pacific tropical cyclone basin begins on May 15 in the east Pacific and June 1 in the central Pacific, and ends on November 30. Since 1949, a total of 84 Category 3 hurricanes have developed in the Northeast Pacific basin. Only one has occurred in the off-season: Hurricane Ekeka of 1992, which peaked in February. A total of two have done so in May, 7 in June, 21 in July, 24 in August, 15 in September, and another 15 in October. None have done so in November.

The formation and development of tropical cyclones, termed tropical cyclogenesis, requires high sea surface temperatures of at least  and low vertical wind shear. When these conditions are met, a pre-existing tropical disturbance – usually a tropical wave – can develop into a tropical cyclone, provided the disturbance is far enough from the Equator to experience a sufficiently strong Coriolis force which is responsible for the counterclockwise rotation of hurricanes in the Northern Hemisphere. During the winter and spring months of December to April, sea surface temperatures in the tropics are usually too low to support development. Also, the presence of a semi-permanent high-pressure area known as the North Pacific High in the eastern Pacific greatly suppresses formation of tropical cyclones in the winter, as the North Pacific High results in vertical wind shear that causes environmental conditions to be unconducive to tropical cyclone formation. Another factor preventing tropical cyclones from forming during the winter is the presence of a semi-permanent low-pressure area called the Aleutian Low between January and April. Its effects in the central Pacific near the 160th meridian west cause tropical waves that form in the area to drift northward into the Gulf of Alaska and dissipate or become extratropical. Its retreat in late-April allows the warmth of the Pacific High to meander in, bringing its powerful clockwise wind circulation with it. The Intertropical Convergence Zone departs southward in mid-May permitting the formation of the earliest tropical waves, coinciding with the start of the eastern Pacific hurricane season on May 15. During summer and autumn, sea surface temperatures rise further to reach near  in July and August, well above the  threshold for tropical cyclogenesis. This allows for hurricanes developing during that time to strengthen significantly.

The El Niño-Southern Oscillation also influences the frequency and intensity of hurricanes in the Northeast Pacific basin. During years with the existence of an El Niño event, sea surface temperatures increase in the Northeast Pacific and average vertical wind shear decreases, resulting in an increase in activity; the opposite happens in the Atlantic basin during El Niño, where increased wind shear creates an unfavorable environment for tropical cyclone formation. Contrary to El Niño, La Niña increases wind shear and decreases sea surface temperatures over the eastern Pacific, while reducing wind shear and increasing sea surface temperatures over the Atlantic.

Within the Northeast Pacific, tropical cyclones generally head west out into the open Pacific Ocean, steered by the westward trade winds. Closer to the end of the season, however, some storms are steered northwards or northeastwards around the subtropical ridge nearer the end of the season, and may bring impacts to the western coasts of Mexico and occasionally even Central America. In the central Pacific basin, the North Pacific High keeps tropical cyclones away from the Hawaiian Islands by forcing them southwards. Combined with cooler waters around the Hawaiian Islands that tend to weaken approaching tropical cyclones, this makes direct impacts on the Hawaiian Islands by tropical cyclones rare.

Systems
Key
 Discontinuous duration (weakened below Category 3 then restrengthened to that classification at least once)
 Intensified past Category 3 intensity after exiting basin

Landfalls

Of the 84 Category 3 hurricanes in the east and central Pacific, a total of 14 made landfall while still a tropical cyclone, collectively resulting in 18 landfalls. As tropical cyclones approach land, they tend to weaken due to land interaction, cooler waters, shallower waters due to shelving, increased vertical wind shear, or dry air. As such, only four of these 14 hurricanes have made landfall while still at Category 3 intensity: Olivia of 1967, Olivia of 1975, Kiko of 1989, and Lane of 2006. Only three made more than one landfall during their lifespan: Hilary of 1993, which made three landfalls, as well as Olivia of 1967 and Fausto of 1996, which made two landfalls each. Only two years – 1971 and 1984 – saw more than one Category 3 hurricane make landfall, though in neither year any of those Category 3 hurricanes made landfall as hurricanes. In the following table, dates where storms made landfall are listed next to the landfall locations.

See also

 List of Pacific hurricanes
 List of Pacific hurricane seasons
 Pacific hurricanes by intensity:
 List of Eastern Pacific tropical storms
 List of Category 1 Pacific hurricanes
 List of Category 2 Pacific hurricanes
 List of Category 4 Pacific hurricanes
 List of Category 5 Pacific hurricanes

Notes

References

List
Category 3
Pacific 3